The "Route 1 Rivalry" is the name given for the American football rivalry between the University of Delaware and Delaware State University. The winner of the game is awarded the First State Cup. Delaware has won each of the eleven games of the rivalry.

History
For years, one of the most controversial aspects of the University of Delaware and Delaware State University football programs was the fact that they had never been scheduled as potential instate rivals for a regular season game. It is highly unusual for two state universities that play on the same athletic tier to not play one another, particularly given their proximity. Critics charged that this had to do with the fact that DSU is a historically black college. Furthermore, supporters of a game between DSU and UD claimed that it would be akin to other instate rivalries and would be good for the state. In 2007, Jeff Pearlman, a University of Delaware graduate and ESPN writer, wrote a scathing article charging the Blue Hens with racism. In response to the charges of racism on UD's part, their supporters pointed out that Delaware has scheduled and played regular season games against several other HBCUs such as Morgan State and North Carolina A&T. UD supporters also claimed that DSU's team was not as strong as the Blue Hens, and that UD's program had made commitments to other universities that they had to fulfill. Finally, UD supporters also noted the fact that the two colleges routinely meet in other sports than football.

Delaware and Delaware State met on the football field for the first time on November 23, 2007 in Newark, DE in the first round of the NCAA Division I National Championship Tournament. The Blue Hens defeated the Hornets 44–7 in front of 19,765 people, the largest playoff crowd in Delaware Stadium history. The game had by then garnered such attention in the media throughout the United States that it was the only first-round game televised live nationally on ESPN.

On February 25, 2009 University of Delaware Coach K. C. Keeler joined Delaware State University Coach Al Lavan along with school officials and state politicians in Dover, Delaware to announce that their schools had signed on to play the first regular season game in their history on September 19, 2009 at the University of Delaware, along with a three-game series in September 2012, 2013, and 2014. This is due to the fact that UD's Delaware Stadium seating of 22,000 is much larger than that of Delaware State's Alumni Stadium at just over 7,000. The schools had been engaged in talks to play a game as early as 2010, but Furman University, who had previously signed a contract to play a home and away series with UD, backed out of game two which was scheduled to be played at UD in order to play University of Missouri and garner a larger payday. This left the University of Delaware with an open date to fill with only a few months before the season started and the two sides quickly completed the deal.

Trophy

The News Journal, the main newspaper in the state of Delaware, held a contest to come up with a trophy for a winner of the rivalry game, which they dubbed the "Route 1 Rivalry" after a major roadway which runs from the north to the south of the state. Delaware Route 1 does not run past either campus, but rather is situated within 5–15 minutes of it. After more than 4,000 suggestions were submitted to the newspaper, the field was narrowed to four choices. "The First State Cup", a reference to Delaware's position as the first state to ratify the Constitution of the United States, therefore making it the first state in the nation, was selected in online voting after more than 10,000 votes were cast on the University of Delaware and Delaware State University's websites. The other choices were "The Diamond State Trophy", a reference to Thomas Jefferson calling Delaware a "diamond among the states"; the "Battle for the Saddle", a reference to Caesar Rodney's ride to Philadelphia to cast Delaware's deciding vote for the Declaration of Independence; and the "Battle for the Hatchet", a reference to Delaware's Return Day tradition of burying a hatchet after elections.

Game results
Delaware has won each of the 11 games, with an average point differential of 25.5.

The second game

In the first regular season meeting between the two schools in the new Route 1 Rivalry, more than 20,000 fans were in attendance for the noon kickoff of the intrastate game. The first quarter saw UD score a touchdown on their opening drive, a 1-yard rush by quarterback Pat Devlin at the 7:41 mark of the first quarter. The drive had initially stalled and kicker John Striefsky had missed a 42-yard field goal attempt wide left, however, the Delaware State Hornets were called for a personal foul on the play, giving UD 15 yards and a first down. The Hornets answered by driving down the field themselves, but had to settle for a 42-yard field goal by kicker Riley Flickinger, a career long. After trading punts several times and a 44-yard field goal attempt by Delaware State missed wide right, the Blue Hens were able to move the ball to the 1 yard line with 1.5 seconds left in the first half. The Blue Hens decided to go for the touchdown and the Hornets made a goal line stop as time expired in the first half with the aid of a questionable call by the officials. In the second half the offenses again moved the ball up and down the field but were still unable to punch it in for a score, with Delaware State reaching the Blue Hens 18 yard line before an interception. Late in the third Delaware took over the ball at their own 30 yard line after stopping the Hornets on downs and executed a 4 play 70-yard drive for a touchdown that again ended with a Pat Devlin 1-yard run to extend the lead to 14–3.

Delaware State again moved into Blue Hens territory for the third straight time, but again turned the ball over as a fumble by Jason Randall on the Delaware 25 yard line was recovered by UD and returned to the 41. The Hens then drove down the field on five plays ending with a Pat Devlin 17-yard touchdown pass to freshman Rob Jones, increasing the lead to 21–3. Delaware State attempted to answer back, driving down the field into scoring range only to turn the ball over again after a Flickinger's 35-yard field goal attempt was blocked.  Delaware State finally got a break, however, as on the ensuing drive Pat Devlin's pass went off the hands of a receiver and was intercepted by free safety Jerome Strums who raced 71 yards down the field for the Hornets first touchdown, cutting into the lead 21–10. After an excellent kickoff return, UD needed just 3 plays to pick up 23 yards for another touchdown as Leon Jackson rushed for a 3-yard touchdown making it 27–10 with 3:36 left in the game. Delaware State was able to muster one final drive as Delaware State quarterback Anthony Glaud kept the ball himself for a 1-yard rushing touchdown with 31 seconds left in the game to complete the scoring at 27–17.

See also  
 List of NCAA college football rivalry games

References

College football rivalries in the United States
Delaware Fightin' Blue Hens football
Delaware State Hornets football
2007 establishments in Delaware